Providence Metropark is a regional park near Grand Rapids, Ohio, USA, owned and managed by Metroparks Toledo. The park contains mule-drawn canal boat rides on the Miami and Erie Canal and features canal lock 44, the only original functioning lock in the state of Ohio. 

The park also contains the Isaac Ludwig Mill which was built in 1866 over a two-year period. The mill was originally a sawmill powered by a water wheel. It was converted to a grist mill driven by water turbines in the 1880s. Today, it functions as a living museum. 

The park is connected by a walking trail to Bend View Metropark and Farnsworth Metropark.

References

External links
Metroparks Toledo
Park Map

Parks in Ohio
Protected areas of Lucas County, Ohio
Works Progress Administration in Toledo, Ohio
Metroparks Toledo